Monash Children's Hospital is a major children's hospital in Melbourne, Australia.

Monash Children's Hospital is part of Monash Health, Victoria's largest healthcare service and one of only four accredited Academic Health Science Centres in Australia.

The hospital includes Victoria's largest Neonatal Intensive Care Unit and provides a full range of specialist services including surgical care, oncology, and rehabilitation services.

It is home to Victoria's only dedicated children's sleep science, is a state-wide referral service for thalassemia, and is a provider of fetal surgery services in partnership with Royal Women's Hospital and Mercy Hospital for Women, Melbourne.

Its services are linked to an adult service, allowing the hospital to provide transition-of-care as children grow older and move to an adult service.

New Monash Children's Hospital

After providing services from within adult hospitals for many years, in 2017 the purpose-built Monash Children's Hospital was opened in Clayton, Victoria.

Monash Children's Hospital is located alongside Monash Medical Centre, and includes the Monash Children's Hospital School.

The New Monash Children's Hospital service profile includes:
 96 In-patient acute beds
 10 Paediatric Intensive care beds
 64 Monash Newborn cots
 20 Early in Life Mental Health Service beds
 8 Neuro Developmental Psychiatry beds
 20 Same-day beds
 12 Oncology same-day beds – 12
 3 Operating theatres – plus a dedicated Endoscopy Suite
 Sleep and Neurodiagnostic studies beds
 Imaging Modalities – 3 modalities (MRI, Ultrasound and X-Ray)
 Outpatient consulting rooms and Allied Health Therapy spaces
 Dedicated Central Sterilising Services Department (CSSD)
 A Starlight Children's Foundation Room
 A Ronald McDonald House Chairities Family Room
 A Hoyts beanbag cinema for patients
 A Radio Lollipop studio

References

External links
Official website

Organisations based in Australia with royal patronage
Children's hospitals in Australia
Teaching hospitals in Australia
Hospitals in Melbourne
1896 establishments in Australia
Hospitals established in 1896
Buildings and structures in the City of Monash